"Oh My Gosh" is a song by British electronic music duo Basement Jaxx. It was released on 14 March 2005 as the lead single from the band's greatest hits album, The Singles. Vula Malinga and rapper Skillah are two vocals contributor in the song.

The song achieved moderate success when it peaked at number eight in the UK Singles Chart and was also nominated for the Popjustice £20 Music Prize. Worldwide, "Oh My Gosh" reached number four in Finland and peaked within the top 40 in Australia, Flemish Belgium and Ireland.

Background and composition
The duo sat down and wrote the song specially as a single for the album. Ratcliffe personally felt encouraged by it; he thought it was a good way to ease them back into songwriting process. They applied the same treatment to their later single "Hush Boy" but, however, failed.

The duo had been working with her for three years earlier.

Critical reception
While reviewing The Singles, AllMusic Andy Kellman listed the song as one of his "track picks" on the album and called the song "rubbery", "deliciously flirtatious and cartoonish." Writing for Drowned in Sound, Julian Ridgway gave the song 5 out of 10, stated: "They’ve proved themselves masters of the dumb pop single in the past – records that make you smile even if they don’t make you think. But with 'Oh My Gosh' the smile’s started to freeze over, like the one you get when people make you look through their holiday photos." He concluded his review by commented that the "airhead" lyrics are "quite funny" but the song "is pretty average stuff for them." In 2005, it was nominated for the Popjustice £20 Music Prize, but lost to "Wake Me Up" by Girls Aloud.

Chart performance
On 26 March 2005 the song debuted at its highest position with number eight on the UK Singles Chart. Thanks to its digital downloading availability, the song charted at number 27 rather than number 45 on its fifth week in.

Music video
The music video was directed by Mat Kirkby, who previously worked with Basement Jaxx on the video for "Good Luck". It is set in a retirement home and features elderly men and women singing about how they like each other whilst doing elderly activities. One of the dancers of the video was Deanne Berry, the dancer and fitness guru known for appearing in the music video for Eric Prydz "Call on Me". In the video, she dressed as an old lady, which she thought was "pretty funny".

The video is the one of two comedic works from Kirkby, the other being his 2013 short film, The Phone Call. "There were some interesting similarities on the shoot – in comedy I'm usually sat behind a monitor, biting my hand/trying to stifle a laugh/keep quiet so that I don’t ruin the take," he said. "In both cases I find that zipping up your snorkel and pulling down your hat helps muffle the sound."

The video was awarded "Best Video" at the 2005 House Music Awards; Malinga was present at the ceremony to receive it.

Track listings

UK CD1 and European CD single
 "Oh My Gosh" (radio edit)
 "Oh My Gosh" (Old Skool dub)

UK CD2
 "Oh My Gosh" (Jaxx club edit)
 "Oh My Gosh" (Kneedeep club mix)
 "Oh My Gosh" (Bugz in the Attic remix)
 "Oh My Dub"

UK 12-inch single
A1. "Oh My Gosh" (Jaxx club edit)
A2. "Oh My Gosh" (Bugz in the Attic remix)
B1. "Oh My Gosh" (Kneedeep club mix)

Australian and New Zealand maxi-CD single
 "Oh My Gosh" (radio edit)
 "Oh My Gosh" (Old Skool dub)
 "Oh My Gosh" (Jaxx club edit)
 "Oh My Gosh" (Kneedeep club mix)
 "Oh My Gosh" (Bugz in the Attic remix)
 "Oh My Dub"

Charts

Weekly charts

Year-end charts

Release history

References

2005 songs
Basement Jaxx songs
Songs written by Felix Buxton
Songs written by Simon Ratcliffe (musician)
XL Recordings singles
UK Independent Singles Chart number-one singles